Yahk Provincial Park is a provincial park located just south of Yahk, British Columbia, 70 kilometres south of Cranbrook, and 14.5 kilometres north of the Canada–United States border at Kingsgate in British Columbia, Canada.

History
The park was established 1956. The area was once a major supplier of railroad ties for the Canadian Pacific Railway.

The park serves as both an introduction to British Columbia for tourists entering from
the United States and a scenic day use area and camping location for travelers
following the southern trans-provincial highway.

Conservation
The park aims to protect a short scenic section of the Moyie River, though the primary purpose for the park is to provide camping and picnicking opportunities for the travelling public.

Recreation
The park provides vehicle accessible camping, picnicking, and fishing opportunities for the travelling public. There is also the opportunity of hiking an abandoned railway grade which borders the park.

References

External links
Yahk Provincial Park

Provincial parks of British Columbia
East Kootenay